Ambrosia Lake is a uranium mining district in McKinley and Cibola counties in New Mexico north of Grants that was heavily mined for uranium starting in the 1950s. It is in an anticlinal dome.

History
Kerr-McGee first learned about rich uranium deposits in the area in 1955. It ran a free assay service and some prospectors had sent in samples that the company found to be high in uranium. Kerr-McGee sent an agent to buy the property. This agent instead double crossed the company and bought the site for himself. Various parties (including United Western Minerals Company of General Patrick Jay Hurley) rushed into the area to get sections of property. However Kerr-McGee wound up owning most of Ambrosia Lake.

Kerr-McGee then allied with Anderson Development Corporation, and Pacific Uranium Mines  to form the Kermac Nuclear Fuels Corporation. They built a mill there. When Kerr-McGee Nuclear split into Quivira Mining and Sequoyah Fuels subsidiaries in 1983, Quivira got the Ambrosia Lake property. When Quivira was sold to Rio Algom in 1989, Rio got the mine and mill. Rio was later bought by Billiton which later became BHP.

Cleanup

Between 1987 and 1995, the Department of Energy remediated the site, encasing  of contaminated material in a  disposal cell. While the DOE/UMTRA site is closed and inactive, the former Kermac mill (under BHP ownership) continues with reclamation activities towards final closure in 2021. Other cleanups at mine and mill sites in the area fall under the EPA's jurisdiction.

Notes

See also 
 Uranium mining in New Mexico
 Church Rock uranium mill spill

Bodies of water of Cibola County, New Mexico
Mining in New Mexico
Uranium mines in the United States